Novelty architecture, also called programmatic architecture or mimetic architecture, is a type of architecture in which buildings and other structures are given unusual shapes for purposes such as advertising or to copy other famous buildings without any intention of being authentic. Their size and novelty means that they often serve as landmarks. They are distinct from architectural follies, in that novelty architecture is essentially usable buildings in eccentric form whereas follies are non-usable, ornamental buildings often in eccentric form.

Overview
Although earlier examples exist, such as the planned but never completed Parisian Elephant of the Bastille, the style generally became popular in the United States, and later to some other countries, as travel by automobile increased in the 1930s. The Statue of Liberty in New York is a statue that is part sculpture and part monument, which like many subsequent examples of novelty architecture, has an accessible interior and became a tourist attraction.

Constructing novelty architecture near to roads became one way of attracting motorists to a diner, coffee shop, or roadside attraction, so buildings were constructed in an unusual shape, especially the shape of the things sold there. "Mimic" architecture became a trend, and many roadside coffee shops were built in the shape of giant coffee pots; hot dog stands were built in the shape of giant hot dogs; and fruit stands were built in the shape of oranges or other fruit. Montréal has the restaurant Gibeau Orange Julep built as a 12-metre high orange-coloured truncated sphere in 1966 (replacing its smaller sphere of 1945) and still operating today.

Novelty or programmatic (mimetic) architecture may take the form of objects not normally associated with buildings, such as characters, animals, people or household objects. Lucy the Elephant and The Longaberger Company's head office are examples. There may be an element of caricature or a cartoon associated with the architecture. Such giant animals, fruits and vegetables, or replicas of famous buildings often serve as attractions themselves. Some are simply unusual shapes or constructed of unusual materials.

Many examples of novelty architecture are designed to attract drive-by customers by taking the form of products sold inside. Others, such as casinos in Las Vegas and Macau, are based on famous landmarks from around the world.

Categories

Buildings resembling objects or creatures 
Mimetic architecture, or buildings designed to imitate a giant object or creature, sometimes having to do with what is being sold or showcased inside.

Examples include the High-Heel Wedding Church in Taiwan, the Mr. Toilet House in South Korea, the Museum of Tea Culture in China, the National Fisheries Development Board and the Chowdiah Memorial Hall auditorium in India, the Elephant Building in Thailand, or the Wolfartsweier Cat Kindergarten and the BMW Headquarters in Germany, to name but a few.

Buildings styled after famous landmarks

Novelty architecture in the form of famous landmarks has been built in China, Georgia, Japan and the United States, for instance. Such replica buildings are extensively used in casinos, hotels, shopping plazas, or amusement parks such as Disneyland where the apparent playfulness and whimsy are intended to add to their appeal. In some cases, such as Carhenge, the structure is an adaptation of a well-known building.

In China, the New South China Mall in Dongguan, features a  replica of the Arc de Triomphe, another replica of Venice's St Mark's Campanile, a  canal with gondolas.

In Batumi on Georgia's Black Sea coast, new high-rise landmark buildings and the renovation of the Old Town have incorporated novelty buildings. Many of these constructions are novelty architecture, including the Sheraton Hotel, designed in the style of the Great Lighthouse at Alexandria, Egypt; the Alphabet Tower ( high), celebrating Georgian script and writing; Piazza, a mixed-used development in the form of an Italian piazza; and buildings designed in the style of the Leaning Tower of Pisa, the Acropolis, and an upside-down White House.

In Japan, there is the Huis Ten Bosch theme park near Nagasaki, which has replicas of Dutch landmarks like Huis ten Bosch and the Dom Tower of Utrecht.

In the US, a shopping plaza in Kansas City, Missouri contains a half-sized replica of La Giralda in Sevilla.Casinos on the Las Vegas Strip, in the form of novelty architecture include the pyramid-shaped Luxor Hotel and the New York-New York Hotel & Casino, a building designed to look like the New York City skyline; Paris Las Vegas whose front suggests the Paris Opera House and the Louvre; and Excalibur Hotel and Casino (1990), with its stylized façade of King Arthur's castle (Camelot). In Macau, The Venetian Macao, like its counterpart in Las Vegas, features a replica of St Mark's Campanile and other buildings in Venice.

Water towers and storage tanks

Water towers and storage tanks, often prominent features in a small town, are two types of buildings which have been shaped or decorated to look like everyday objects. There are many versions of these types of novelty architecture.

Water towers exist in many forms, among them peaches, coffee pots, and teapots; corn cobs, wine bottles, and sauce bottles; and fishing bobbers and strawberries.

Several breweries and other businesses have designed holding tanks in the shape of giant cans of beer or other containers.

Giant sculptures
Sculptures of ordinary items scaled to building size are another aspect of novelty architecture. Such sculptures appear at roadside parks and attractions or museums in Australia, Canada, Japan, New Zealand, the Philippines and the United States. They are likely to represent local animals, such as fish or other wildlife; local plants, such as apples or pineapples; well-known local people such as Paul Bunyan; food, such as the branded candy bars at the former Curtiss Candy Company; sporting or mechanical equipment such as giant bats, balls, or tires; musical instruments, such as guitars; clothing, such as giant boots; or popular creatures, such as dinosaurs.

In some instances, the giant sculpture provides a reference for the building to which it is connected. Examples are the giant baseball bat outside the Louisville Slugger Museum & Factory and the giant "paper" aircraft at Cleveland Hopkins International Airport.

Other styles
Architecture popular in the 1950s-1960s in southern California and in Florida featured sharp corners, tilted roofs, starburst designs, and fanciful shapes. This came to be known as Googie, Doo Wop, or populuxe architecture.

Long-established firms whose features are well-known could still qualify as novelty architecture; examples include McDonald's original golden-arches design and the self-referential design of the White Castle restaurants.

Gallery

Buildings around the world

Buildings in the United States

Statues

See also

 Australia's big things
 Ice hotels, temporary hotels made of ice and snow, found in the coldest regions of the world
 John Margolies, a photographer who specialized in roadside attractions, including novelty architecture
 List of world's largest roadside attractions
 Muffler Men, oversized molded fiberglass sculptures used to promote roadside businesses
 New Zealand's big things

References

External links

 Large Canadian roadside attractions 
 Roadside America: Big Coffee Pots
 The American Roadside: News and updates on America's fading roadside attractions
 Tacky Tourist Photos